Brendon Alan Hackwill (9 May 1942 - 3 August 1995) was an Australian sportsman who played Australian rules football for Fitzroy in the Victorian Football League (VFL) during the 1960s and also represented his country at basketball.

Hackwill was with Fitzroy in what was a bad era for the club and experienced just the solitary win from his 17 senior games. As a basketball player he had represented Australia at the 1964 Summer Olympics in Tokyo where they finished ninth out of the 16 competing nations. He appeared in nine games and scored 12 points in a win over Mexico.

References

External links

Holmesby, Russell and Main, Jim (2007). The Encyclopedia of AFL Footballers. 7th ed. Melbourne: Bas Publishing.

1942 births
1995 deaths
Australian rules footballers from Victoria (Australia)
Fitzroy Football Club players
Australian men's basketball players
Olympic basketball players of Australia
Basketball players at the 1964 Summer Olympics